Handcrafted is an album by guitarist Kenny Burrell recorded in 1978 and released on the Muse label.

Reception 

The Allmusic review called it a "Steady, consistently swinging trio date with Burrell's fine guitar playing as the focus" and stated: "There's nothing exceptional here, but the breezy pace and bluesy feel are nice".

Track listing 
 "You and the Night and the Music" (Arthur Schwartz, Howard Dietz) – 4:43
 "So Little Time" (Kenny Burrell, Richard Evans) – 6:27
 "I'm Glad There Is You" (Jimmy Dorsey, Paul Mertz) – 8:15
 "All Blues" (Miles Davis) – 10:08
 "It Could Happen to You" (Jimmy Van Heusen, Johnny Burke) – 5:47

Personnel 
Kenny Burrell – electric guitar (tracks 1, 3 & 4), acoustic guitar (tracks 2 & 5)
Reggie Johnson – bass
Sherman Ferguson – drums

References 

Kenny Burrell albums
1979 albums
Muse Records albums